Admiral of the Fleet Sir Reginald Yorke Tyrwhitt, 1st Baronet,  (10 May 1870 – 30 May 1951) was a Royal Navy officer. During the First World War he served as commander of the Harwich Force. He led a supporting naval force of 31 destroyers and two cruisers at the Battle of Heligoland Bight in August 1914, in which action the 1st Battlecruiser Squadron under Sir David Beatty sank three German cruisers and one German destroyer with minimal loss of allied warships. Tyrwhitt also led the British naval forces during the Cuxhaven Raid in December 1914, when British seaplanes destroyed German Zeppelin airships and at the Battle of Dogger Bank in January 1915, in which action Tyrwhitt again supported Beatty's powerful battlecruiser squadron.

After the war, Tyrwhitt went on to be Senior Naval Officer, Gibraltar, commander of the 3rd Light Cruiser Squadron in the Mediterranean Fleet and then Commander-in-Chief, Coast of Scotland. He also served as Commander-in-Chief, China during a period of disturbances and tension with the Nationalist Government. His last appointment was as Commander-in-Chief, The Nore.

Naval career

Early years
Born the son of the Rev. Richard St John Tyrwhitt and Caroline Tyrwhitt (née Yorke), Tyrwhitt joined the training ship HMS Britannia as a cadet on 15 July 1883. He was assigned to the battleship  in the Mediterranean Fleet in August 1885 and, following his promotion to midshipman on 15 December 1885, he was appointed to the cruiser  in the Training Squadron in November 1888. He transferred to the armoured cruiser  in 1889 and, following promotion to sub-lieutenant on 14 March 1890, he transferred to the battleship  later that year. He joined the training brig  at Portsmouth in March 1892 and, having been promoted to lieutenant on 25 August 1892, he transferred to the light cruiser  on the North America and West Indies Station in late 1892. He became commanding officer of the destroyer  in January 1896 and then became first lieutenant on the despatch vessel  in the Mediterranean Fleet in late 1896. He went on to be First Lieutenant in the cruiser  on the North America and West Indies Station in December 1899 and, having been promoted to commander on 1 January 1903, he became executive officer in the cruiser  early in 1903.

Tyrwhitt became commanding officer of the destroyer  in 1904, of the scout cruiser  in 1906 and of the scout cruiser  in 1907. Promoted to captain on 30 June 1908, he became captain of the 4th Destroyer Flotilla in the cruiser  in August 1909. He went on to be flag captain to the commander of the 6th Cruiser Squadron in the Mediterranean Fleet first in the armoured cruiser  in September 1910 and then in the armoured cruiser  in early 1912 before becoming captain of the 2nd Destroyer Flotilla in the scout cruiser  in August 1912. He became commodore of all destroyers in the First Fleet in December 1913.

First World War

Tyrwhitt was given command of the Harwich Force at the start of the First World War flying his broad pendant in the protected cruiser . With his flag in the light cruiser , Tyrwhitt led a supporting naval force of 31 destroyers and two cruisers at the Battle of Heligoland Bight in August 1914 in which action the 1st Battlecruiser Squadron under Sir David Beatty sank three German cruisers and one German destroyer with minimal loss of allied warships. For this action Tyrwhitt was appointed a Companion of the Order of the Bath on 21 October 1914.

Tyrwhitt also led the British naval forces during the Cuxhaven Raid in December 1914, when British seaplanes destroyed German Zeppelin airships, and at the Battle of Dogger Bank in January 1915, in which action Tyrwhitt again supported Beatty's powerful battlecruiser squadron. During the Battle of Jutland in May 1916, the Admiralty held back Tyrwhitt's forces in case of a German attack on the coast. Tyrwhitt was awarded the Distinguished Service Order on 3 June 1916, appointed a Commander of the French Legion of Honour on 15 September, and made a naval aide-de-camp to the King on 21 May 1917. He was also advanced to Knight Commander of the Order of the Bath on 15 July 1917, and appointed an Officer of the Military Order of Savoy on 11 August.

Tyrwhitt took part in the Zeebrugge Raid and the Ostend Raid on the night of 23 April 1918, for which he was awarded the French Croix de Guerre on 23 July. At the end of the war he accepted the surrender of the German U-boats at Harwich. He was also promoted to rear admiral on 2 December 1919, and created a baronet of Terschelling and of Oxford on 13 December.

After the war

Tyrwhitt became Senior Naval Officer, Gibraltar in July 1919, commander of the 3rd Light Cruiser Squadron in the Mediterranean Fleet with his flag in the light cruiser  in 1921 and then Commander-in-Chief, Coast of Scotland in June 1923. Promoted to vice admiral on 18 January 1925, he went on to be Commander-in-Chief, China with his flag in Hawkins in November 1926 during a period of disturbances and tension with the Nationalist Government. Promoted to full admiral on 27 February 1929 and advanced to Knight Grand Cross of the Order of the Bath on 30 July 1929, he went on to be Commander-in-Chief, The Nore in May 1930.

In the aftermath of the Invergordon Mutiny in September 1931, Tyrwhitt was instrumental in preventing Vice-Admiral Frederic Dreyer, the Deputy Chief of the Naval Staff, from taking command of the Atlantic Fleet and ending any hopes Dreyer had of becoming First Sea Lord. Tyrwhitt was appointed First and Principal Naval Aide-de-Camp on 10 October 1932. When he hauled down his flag for the last time in May 1933, Tyrwhitt was the last British flag officer who had served in the First World War to do so. Promoted to Admiral of the Fleet on 31 July 1934, he briefly served in the Home Guard during the Second World War. He died at Ellenden Nursing Home in Sandhurst, Kent on 30 May 1951.

Family
In 1903 Tyrwhitt married Angela Corbally; they had two daughters and a son (Admiral Sir St John Tyrwhitt). The elder daughter, Mary, was the last director of the Auxiliary Territorial Service, and first director of the Women's Royal Army Corps.

References

Sources

External links
 

|-

|-

|-

Tyrwhitt, Reginald
Tyrwhitt, Reginald
Baronets in the Baronetage of the United Kingdom
Commandeurs of the Légion d'honneur
Companions of the Distinguished Service Order
Knights Grand Cross of the Order of the Bath
Officers of the Military Order of Savoy
Recipients of the Croix de Guerre 1914–1918 (France)
Recipients of the Order of the Sacred Treasure
Tyrwhitt, Reginald
People from Oxford
Military personnel from Oxfordshire